Leucopogon maritimus is a species of flowering plant in the heath family Ericaceae and is endemic to the west coast of Western Australia. It is a low, spreading shrub with hairy young branchlets, erect, narrowly elliptic leaves and erect white, tube-shaped flowers in upper leaf axils or on the ends of branches.

Description
Both surfaces of the leaves are more or less glabrous and shiny.

Taxonomy and naming
Leucopogon maritimus was first formally described in 2011 by Michael Clyde Hislop in the journal Nuytsia from specimens he collected near Wilbinga in 2008. The specific epithet (maritimus) means "by the sea", referring to this species' distribution.

Distribution and habitat

Conservation status
Leucopogon maritimus is listed as "Priority One" by the Government of Western Australia Department of Biodiversity, Conservation and Attractions, meaning that it is known from only one or a few locations that are potentially at risk.

References

maritimus
Ericales of Australia
Flora of Western Australia
Plants described in 2011